Irving Townsend (November 27, 1920 – December 17, 1981) was an American record producer and author. He is most famous for having produced the Miles Davis album Kind of Blue, which is the best-selling jazz album of all time according to the RIAA. He later served as president of the National Academy of Recording Arts and Sciences of the United States.

Townsend, a former jazz bandleader, became an advertising copywriter for Columbia Records.  He then convinced George Avakian to have him assist on recording sessions, and by the mid-1950s he was a full-time producer. He became Davis's producer after the departures of Avakian and Cal Lampley.

Townsend wrote many liner notes for Columbia, including notes for the album Black, Brown and Beige by Duke Ellington and Mahalia Jackson. In 1975, Townsend wrote an article in The Atlantic Monthly called "Ellington in Private" detailing his meeting with Duke at Newport Jazz Festival in 1956 which led to Ellington's subsequent signing with Columbia.

Selected Production Discography
Billie Holiday
Miles Davis                      
Mahalia Jackson
Leonard Bernstein
Duke Ellington
André Previn
Johnny Mathis
Percy Faith  
Wayne Shorter
Chico Hamilton
Jimmy Rushing
Dave Brubeck
Doris Day
Ada Moore
Flatt & Scruggs
Frankie Laine

Author
John Hammond on Record: An Autobiography (co-author)
The Less Expensive Spread: Delights & Dilemmas of a Weekend Cowboy
The Tavern
Separate Lifetimes
Articles in various publications including The Atlantic Monthly

References

1920 births
1981 deaths
American record producers
American writers about music
Columbia Records
20th-century American biographers
20th-century American businesspeople